Boris Andreyevich Mokrousov (27 February 1909 – 27 March 1968) was a Soviet and Russian composer.

Biography 
He was born in Kanavino, Nizhny Novgorod.

He died in Moscow, and was buried in Novodevichy Cemetery.

Filmography
Bride with a Dowry (1953)
Spring on Zarechnaya Street (1956)
The Cook (1965)
The Elusive Avengers (1967)

Awards 

 Medal "For Valiant Labour in the Great Patriotic War 1941–1945"
 Medal "In Commemoration of the 800th Anniversary of Moscow"
 Stalin Prize (1948)

References

External links 
 

1909 births
1968 deaths
20th-century composers
20th-century Russian male musicians
Musicians from Nizhny Novgorod
Moscow Conservatory alumni
Stalin Prize winners
Socialist realism
Male opera composers
Male operetta composers
Russian film score composers
Russian opera composers
Soviet film score composers
Soviet male composers
Soviet opera composers
Soviet songwriters
Burials at Novodevichy Cemetery